Happiness is a 2013 play by David Williamson.

Plot
Roland, a psychology professor, is an expert in the pursuit of happiness but finds he has trouble in his own life.

References

External links
Review of 2013 Sydney production at The Australian
Review of 2013 Sydney production  at Oz Baby Boomers
Review of 2013 Sydney production at Stage Whispers

Plays by David Williamson
2013 plays